Sarah Ferrati (9 December 1909 - 3 March 1982), sometimes spelled Sara Ferrati, was an Italian actress, mainly active on stage.

Life and career 
She made her stage debut in 1928, and became a lead actress in 1932. She had her breakout working at the Teatro Eliseo in plays directed by Orazio Costa and Ettore Giannini. She worked on stage with prominent directors including Luchino Visconti, Franco Zeffirelli, Giorgio Strehler, Jacques Copeau, Max Reinhardt, Renato Simoni, Gianfranco De Bosio. In 1948 she married the opera singer Luigi Infantino. In the 1950s and 1960s she had an intense television career, working with Vittorio Cottafavi, Anton Giulio Majano, Daniele D'Anza, Silverio Blasi, Sandro Bolchi, Mario Landi, among others. Her last appearance was in 1979, in the Augusto Novelli's comedy play Gallina vecchia.

References

External links 

1909 births
1982 deaths
People from Prato
Italian film actresses
Italian stage actresses
Italian television actresses
Italian voice actresses